Song Ji-eun, (born May 5, 1990), better known mononymously as Jieun, is a South Korean singer and actress best known as a member of the South Korean girl group Secret. Aside from her group's activities, she has released several solo songs and participated in various OSTs. In 2011, her second single, "Going Crazy" featuring Bang Yong-guk, went to become her first number one single on the Gaon Chart as a solo artist.

Life and career

1990–2008: Early life and career beginnings
Song Ji-eun was born on May 5, 1990, in South Korea, she is an only child. Having interest in music when she was young, she auditioned for JYP Entertainment at an early age. While in JYP Entertainment, she sang OSTs of Korean dramas in 2007 and 2008 such as "Learning To Fly" for Air City. Under JYP Entertainment, she was set off to debut as a four-member girl group with Sistar's Hyorin, BESTie's Uji and EXID's Hani, but the plan was scrapped and Ji-eun then left JYP Entertainment and joined TS Entertainment.

2009–2014: Debut with Secret and rising popularity

In September 2009, TS Entertainment announced that they will be debuting a four-member girl group in October 2009. Song, along with Han Sun-hwa, Jung Ha-na and Jun Hyo-seong, debuted as the group, Secret. Prior to their debut, the group was on a documentary show called "Secret Story" which chronicled their debut process. They released their debut single "I Want You Back" in October 2009.

In December 2009, she sang a duet with Hwanhee titled, "Yesterday".

After Secret's success with "Shy Boy", TS Entertainment announced that Song will make her solo debut with the song "Going Crazy". The song was dubbed as an "emotional ballad track" and "different to what she's shown through Secret". The single, released in March 2011, was a success and peaked at number one on Gaon Singles Chart, making it Song's and Bang's first number one single in Korea.

In 2013, Song released her first single album Hope Torture, which she unveiled at her album showcase at the Olleh Square in Gwanghwamun.

In 2014, Song released her first extended play, titled 25, which contained two singles "Don't Look At Me Like That" and "Pretty Age 25". The same year, Song made her acting debut in the web drama Drawing, Spring, as a part-time worker for a PR team, who loves all living things but has traumatic experience with horses.

2015–present: Acting career, Bobby Doll, and departure from Secret
In April 2015, Song featured in fantasy youth comedy The Superman Age, an 8-episode series which aired on cable channel tvN. She then starred in the web drama  The Immutable Law of First Love, based on a web novel of the same name, playing a photographer who loves abandoned dogs. In November, she starred in KBS's daily drama Sweet Home, Sweet Honey and received positive reception on her performance.

In September 2016, Song released her second extended play, titled Bobby Doll containing six tracks, including the title track of the same name.

In April 2017, Song starred in OCN's romantic comedy drama My Secret Romance alongside Sung Hoon.

In August 2017, Song submitted a request to the Korean Commercial Arbitration Board to verify that her contract is no longer valid due to TS Entertainment not following the terms of the contract. Song later took to her Instagram where she announced her departure from Secret.

Discography

EPs

Single albums

Singles

As lead artist

As featured artist

Soundtracks

Participation in albums

Music videos

Filmography

Film

Television series

Web series

Awards and nominations

Asia Artist Awards

|-
| 2017
| Herself
| Popularity Award (Actress)
|

Seoul Music Awards 

|-
| rowspan=3 | 2015
| 25
| Bonsang
| 
|-
| rowspan=2 | Herself
| Popularity Award
| 
|-
| Hallyu Special Award
|

References

External links

   

Secret (South Korean band) members
TS Entertainment artists
South Korean pianists
South Korean women pianists
People from Seoul
1990 births
Living people
South Korean female idols
K-pop singers
South Korean women pop singers
South Korean television personalities
South Korean television actresses
20th-century women pianists